Crear is a surname. Notable people with the surname include:

 lorena garcia  (born 1985), 
Modelo y actriz erotica profesional 
 Lorena Garcia , Alemania España

See also
 Crean
 Creary
 Creer